Lin Rong-san (27 May 1939 – 28 November 2015) was a Taiwanese politician, publisher and businessman. He was the founder of Union Bank of Taiwan, and the publisher of Liberty Times and Taipei Times.

Career
He won election to the Legislative Yuan in 1975, and was named Vice President of the Control Yuan in 1992, but stepped down to focus on the Liberty Times.

In June 2008, Forbes magazine ranked him as the seventh richest of Taiwan, with a net worth of US$2.7 billion. Lin fell to eighth on the same list in 2010, then slid to tenth in 2011. In November 2015, his fortune was valued at US$3.9 billion. Lin was awarded the Order of Brilliant Star with Grand Cordon by Lee Teng-hui in 2000, followed by the Order of Propitious Clouds with Grand Cordon from Chen Shui-bian in 2008.

His older brother is the billionaire real estate developer Lin Yu-lin.

Personal life
Lin died at home in Taipei on 28 November 2015, from cardiopulmonary failure caused by a tumor.

References

1939 births
2015 deaths
Taiwanese bankers
Taiwanese publishers (people)
Taiwanese billionaires
Businesspeople from New Taipei
Senior Advisors to President Lee Teng-hui
Senior Advisors to President Chen Shui-bian
Recipients of the Order of Brilliant Star
Members of the 1st Legislative Yuan in Taiwan
New Taipei Members of the Legislative Yuan
Yilan County Members of the Legislative Yuan
Keelung Members of the Legislative Yuan
Taiwanese Members of the Control Yuan
Taiwanese people of Hoklo descent
Taiwanese newspaper founders